Glebov or Glebova (feminine) is a Russian surname, derived from the given name Gleb. Notable people with the surname include:

Andrey Glebov (1770–1854), Imperial Russian colonel
Ilja Glebov (born 1987), Estonian pair skater.
Natalie Glebova (born 1981), Russian-born Canadian who won Miss Universe 2005 from Canada
Nikolai Glebov-Avilov (1887–1937), prominent Bolshevik
Pyotr Glebov (1915–2000), Soviet actor
Vladimir Glebov (born 1957), Russian military officer

See also
6108 Glebov
Vladimir "Uncle Vlad" Glebov, a central antagonist in Grand Theft Auto IV

Russian-language surnames
Patronymic surnames
Surnames from given names